Andreas Hein (born 9 September 1972) is a German sprinter. He competed in the men's 4 × 400 metres relay at the 1996 Summer Olympics.

References

1972 births
Living people
Athletes (track and field) at the 1996 Summer Olympics
German male sprinters
Olympic athletes of Germany
Place of birth missing (living people)